Patrick Bonfrisco is a musician and podcaster based out of Orange County, CA. He has recorded and performed with several bands, most notably enewetak, joining the band in 1995 following the departure of original drummer Ben Fall. He remained an active member until enewetak disbanded in 2004, and returned for the reunion shows in 2015. Bonfrisco launched Ramshackle Records in 1995, and organized the Novemberfest music festival from 1992 through 2004.

He can currently be heard on a number of podcasts including Radio Free Mandalore, Hollywood & Vine, The HoloFeed, and Geek Radio.

Bands 

Bonfrisco played drums in the following bands:

 Disturbing the Peace (1992–1993)
 Bobwolf (1993–1994)
 Jackie Paper (1994–1995)
 enewetak (1995–2004, 2015)
 The Touching Game (1999–2000)
 Run. Dash. Sprint. (2003–2004)

Discography 

Bonfrisco played drums on the following releases:

 Bobwolf - The Vinyl Gift (1994 - Black Coffee)
 Jackie Paper - Things Like This  (1995 - Ramshackle)
 enewetak - enewetak (1995 - Revolutionary Power Tools)
 enewetak - and the beat goes on... (1996 - Revolutionary Power Tools)
 enewetak - Guns. Elvis loved them. (1996 - Kiss of Steel)
 enewetak - The Easyrider Sessions, Volume I (1995 - BukBuk)
 enewetak - Unruh Split (1996 - Feast and Famine)
 enewetak - The Easyrider Sessions, Volume II (1997 - Carpathian)
 enewetak - Onward to Valhalla (1997 - Crawlspace)
 enewetak - The Easyrider Sessions, Volume III (2003 - King of the Monsters)

Podcasts 

Bonfrisco appears on the following podcasts:

 Geek Radio
 Hollywood & Vine (Radio Free Pocasting network)
 The HoloFeed
 John in Sixty Seconds (Radio Free Podcasting network)
 Radio Free Mandalore (Radio Free Podcasting network)

Bonfrisco formerly co-hosted the following podcasts:

 Comics After Dark (RattHaus Productions)
 My Fire Inside (RattHaus Productions)
 That's Life (RattHaus Productions)

Personal life 

Bonfrisco is a vegetarian. He resides in Anaheim, CA.

External links 
 Patrick Bonfrisco on Band To Band
 Patrick Bonfrisco on Discogs
 Bobwolf on Discogs
 Jackie Paper on Discogs
 enewetak on Discogs
 enewetak on Facebook
 Run. Dash. Sprint. on Facebook
 King of the Monsters Records
 KPFK Geek Radio on Facebook
 That's Life podcast on Facebook

References 

Living people
American rock drummers
Musicians from Anaheim, California
American podcasters
Year of birth missing (living people)